Ganga Tere Desh Mein  is a 1988 Bollywood action drama film directed by Vijay Reddy, starring Dharmendra, Shatrughan Sinha and Jaya Prada. The movie is a remake of director's own 1987 Kannada movie Huli Hebbuli.

Plot 
Police officer, Ajay, arrests a mentally deranged suspect, Vijay Nath, suffering from memory loss. Ajay's widowed mother treats Vijay with kindness. Inspector Ajay decides to investigate eventually leading up to the true outcome of their actual relation to one another.

Cast 
 Dharmendra as Vijay Nath
 Jaya Prada as Dr. Asha
 Shatrughan Sinha as Police Inspector Ajay Nath
 Dimple Kapadia as Princess
 Kader Khan as Sewaram
 Asrani as Mewaram
 Raj Babbar as Police Inspector Amar
 Sudhir Dalvi as Ram Nath
 Kiran Kumar as Kobra/Zalim Singh
 Nirupa Roy as Ajay's Mother

Soundtrack 
Lyrics: Anand Bakshi

References

External links 
 

1988 films
1980s Hindi-language films
Films scored by Laxmikant–Pyarelal
Hindi remakes of Kannada films
Indian action drama films